Johan Willemsz, Latinized Johannes Harlemius (1538–1578) was a Dutch Jesuit and Hebraist from Haarlem who taught at the Jesuit house of studies in Leuven. He briefly taught Hebrew at the Collegium Trilingue (1567–1568). An expert on the Old Testament, he advised on both the Plantin Polyglot (1573) and Lucas Brugensis's revision of the Leuven Vulgate (1574).

References

External links 

 

1538 births
1578 deaths
16th-century Dutch Jesuits
Christian Hebraists